Bellow is a type of animal vocalization common amongst bulls and other large animals such as Rhinoceros, Bison, Yak, Buffalo, And Red Deer. It's a form of roaring and reverberating sound.  Also, the bull snake bellows and hisses as its defensive sounds, It bellows at first in a short period high amplitude, followed by a longer period of low amplitude before it maintains a constant sound.

Bugles are also a form of vocalization in cattle, except that it is of high frequency while bellows are of low frequency measured in Hertz (Hz). The frequency of bellows and bugles depends on factors such as gender, species of cattle, and environment, with many anatomical patterns in the vocal production of the sounds.

Moo and Importance 
Another sound a cow makes is Mooing, and they do so to show anger, find other herds, and find their mates. Bulls also bellow to show contentment.

References 

Animal sounds